Elections to the Legislative Assembly of the Indian Union Territory of Pondicherry took place in May 2006 to constitute the Twelfth Assembly of Pondicherry. The UPA alliance comprising Congress, Dravida Munnetra Kazhagam, Pattali Makkal Katchi and Communist Party of India has won and N. Rangasamy of Congress got elected as chief minister.

Parties and alliances
Source:





Results
Source:

Elected members

See also 
Government of Puducherry
Puducherry Legislative Assembly
Pondicherry Representative Assembly
List of Chief Ministers of Puducherry
List of speakers of the Puducherry Legislative Assembly
List of lieutenant governors of Puducherry
2011 Puducherry Legislative Assembly election

References

Puducherry
2006
2000s in Puducherry